Minister of Foreign Affairs of the Republic of Maldives is a cabinet minister in charge of the Ministry of Foreign Affairs of Maldives, responsible for conducting foreign relations of the country.

The following is a list of foreign ministers of Maldives since 1932:

References

Foreign
Foreign Ministers
Politicians
Foreign Ministers of the Maldives